Chloe Leland is an Emmy and BAFTA award-winning British Director Writer, Producer, Executive Producer and Creative Director. 

She is daughter of Writer, Environmentalist and Ecologist, Stephanie Greenwood (nee Lenz), co-editor of Reclaim The Earth and founder of Women for Life on Earth and British film director and writer David Leland (Peaky Blinders, Land Girls, Band of Brothers, Wish You Were Here, Mona Lisa, The Big Man, The Borgias) . 

She became first notable for playing Emily Lloyd's younger sister in David Leland's directional debut Wish You Were Here in 1987. She later worked for Working Title as a researcher on several productions and as a location scout on the movie Land Girls (1998). 

Since that time she has developed, written, produced, directed and shot documentaries and drama for television, including top-rating series for the Discovery Channel, Animal Planet, Nat Geo, Netflix and BBC. She worked as camera operator on Grammy Award-winning Concert for George and wrote, produced and directed Walking with Monsters, for which she won at the 58th Primetime Emmy Awards in the category Outstanding Animated Program (For Programming One Hour or More) and a VES as well as being nominated for a BAFTA and RTS. 

Her next series, Fight For Life, received record ratings for BBC1, as well as winning BAFTA, RTS and VES awards. In 2010 her work was once again Emmy-nominated for America – Story of Us (a US series), on which she was series VFX creative director.  

She has held top-level positions with some of the UK's top production companies, such as Head of Development for Impossible Pictures and Creative Director for Jane Root's Nutopia, where she developed films such as America - Story of Us, One Strange Rock (Nat Geo, Netflix) and Babies (Netflix) . 

Leland has worked as Development Executive for BBC Specialist Factual as well as many indies, originating and developing reams of commissioned series and specials. She's well-known for her story-telling skills and developing unique visual signatures for her productions often using her extensive VFX experience.

She has written for factual and fully scripted television as well as feature articles for the Independent and Guardian. 

She is currently  a Creative Director and Executive Producer at two time Academy Award-winning, Grain Media focused on projects with social purpose.

Filmography
 1987 – Wish You Were Here (as actress)
 1999 – Swingers Faithful To You in My Fashion (as associate producer)
 2001 – Red Gold: The Epic Story of Blood (as associate producer)
 2002 – Secret Life of the Crocodile – BBC 1.
 2003 – Genome – BBC1.
 2003 – Stephen Lawrence – Ten Years After (as director)
 2005 – Walking with Monsters (as director and producer)
 2006 – Monsters, Dinos and Beasts- A Special. Director and producer. Nat Geo.
 2007 – Fight for Life (as director and series visual effects director)
 2010 – America – The Story of US. Series visual effects creative director
One Strange Rock - Nat Geo- Development Consultant/Exec
Babies - Netflix - Development Consultant/Exec
 2017 – Barbarians Rising – show runner and series visual effects creative director/producer

External links

BFI Film & TV Database Entry

British film actresses
Living people
20th-century British actresses
Year of birth missing (living people)
British television producers
British women television producers